The Dunwells are an English rock band, formed in Leeds in 2009. The group consists of brothers Joseph Dunwell (vocals) and David Dunwell (guitar, vocals), along with friends Adam Taylor (drums, vocals) and Rob Clayton (bass, vocals).

The band was signed by Playing In Traffic Records in 2011. Their debut album, "Blind Sighted Faith", produced by John Porter, was released in February 2012. In June 2012, Playing In Traffic struck a deal with Concord Music Group, and the band re-released "Blind Sighted Faith" through Concord in August 2012.

The Dunwells released 'Show Me Emotion EP' in September 2014, produced by Stephen Harris.

Recently, the band has released a new single entitled 'Lucky Ones'. It is the first single, and title track of, their upcoming EP, 'Lucky Ones'. The EP was released on 25 May via Concord Music Group. In July 2019 performed to a packed venue in Taunton Vivary Park with Tom Jones (singer).

History

Early years (2009–2011)
The band members started out playing pubs separately in Leeds, England. The two brothers, Joseph and David Dunwell, had been performing as solo acts throughout Yorkshire. The Dunwell brothers recruited childhood friend Jonny Lamb (drums), along with local musicians Dave Hanson (lead guitar) and Lee Dawson (bass). When a booking agent heard them play an open mic together, she insisted on booking them a show as a group. In October 2009, record producer Dave Creffield formalized their band status by recording them. Rob Clayton, Jonny Lamb's cousin, later took Dawson's place on the bass in 2011 after Dawson left the band. Joseph and David Dunwell and Rob Clayton all attended St. Mary's Catholic High School, Menston

The Dunwells recorded live at ITV Studios in 2009 and performed on BBC Radio Leeds during the same year. In March 2010, the band released their self-funded debut single "Elizabeth," which reached number 31 on the UK Indie Chart. Continuing with that momentum, the band was featured as Caffe Nero's "Artist of the Month" in November 2010.

Blind Sighted Faith (2011–2012)
English singer-songwriter Tony Moore spotted the band while they were performing at The Bedford in London. Moore invited the group to perform at the 2011 Folk Alliance International in Memphis, Tennessee. Shortly after their U.S. performance, The Dunwells signed with the Austin, Texas based label Playing In Traffic Records in May 2011. Shortly before the release of the band's debut album, they were named HMV's Next Big Thing of 2012 at Manchester's Ritz on 10 February 2012. Four days later, The Dunwells released Blind Sighted Faith on 14 February 2012. The album was recorded at Willie Nelson's Pedernales studio with producer John Porter. Following the release, during the month of March, The Dunwells played at various renowned venues and festivals, including opening for Mumford & Sons and playing South by Southwest. In June 2012, Playing In Traffic Records struck a joint venture for The Dunwells with Concord Music Group.

The band then enlisted the help of George Drakoulias, who recorded and produced the band's next single, "So Beautiful". Playing In Traffic Records in conjunction with Concord Music Group re-released Blind Sighted Faith on 28 August 2012 with the addition of "So Beautiful." Following the re-release of "Blind Sighted Faith," the band made their US Network Television debut in August 2012, performing their song "Follow The Road" on NBC's The Tonight Show with Jay Leno. The band wrapped up 2012 with performances at Lollapalooza, Austin City Limits, and Red Rocks.

Follow the Road (2013–2014)
The Dunwells took a break at the beginning of 2013 and then returned to the road in the spring, traveling to Austin, Texas for SXSW and then continuing on to do shows along the west coast. The band returned to the UK and released their second album full-length album, Follow the Road, in May 2013. Although the band hailed from the UK, this was their first full-length release in the United Kingdom. "Follow the Road" incorporated many of the same songs as "Blind Sighted Faith", but it was completely resequenced and included a variety of remixes and alternate versions that were geared towards their British fans. The album included remixes by Tim Palmer (Pearl Jam, Robert Plant, Jason Mraz) and Jamie Candilorio. Following the UK release, the band headed back over to America for their Follow the Road summer tour. They hit multiple festivals in Canada and United States, including Bunbury Music Festival, Winnipeg Folk Festival, and Lollapalooza, along with a variety of venues throughout the United States. While on tour the band performed at iHeartRadio studios in New York City. Following their summer tour and return to the UK, lead guitarist Dave Hanson left the band to pursue a solo career. The band decided to continue on as a 4-piece. They spent the remainder of 2013 recording their second full-length album.

Show Me Emotion EP and Lucky Ones (2014–2015)
After spending the remainder of 2013 in the studio, The Dunwells returned to the scene in late January, making an appearance on The Andrew Marr Show on BBC1, performing their hit song, I Could Be A King. The band hit the road in April 2014 on their Light Up the Sky tour. The tour spanned across the United Kingdom hitting all the major stops along the way. In conjunction with the Light Up the Sky tour, the band released their first single, Sleepless Nights, off their newest EP, Show Me Emotion. At the conclusion of the successful Light Up the Sky tour, The Dunwells returned stateside to play a short run of shows centered around their performance at Bonnaroo Music and Arts Festival. At the conclusion of The Dunwells short U.S. run, Jonny Lamb left the band to take care of his newborn son. Upon their return to the UK, the band replaced Jonny Lamb on drums with Adam Taylor who had filled in for the band on previous occasions. The Dunwells kicked off their run of English festivals in July 2014. playing Hop Farm Festival Tramlines Festival, and Cornbury Music Festival, among many others.

On 9 September 2014, the band released a 4-song EP entitled Show Me Emotion, produced by Stephen Harris (Kodaline, Kaiser Chiefs, The Wombats), with the title track being the first single. The single, Show Me Emotion received widespread regional radio play in the UK, as well as spins on national mediums, such as BBC Radio 6 Music. The Scunthorpe Telegraph said "the title track has echoes of Elbow but it should establish The Dunwells as chart stars." Following the release of Show Me Emotion, the band has made multiple appearances on English television and radio, with appearances on BBC Look North TV, BBC Leeds, BBC Manchester, and many others. The band also played a run of shows on the western coast of the United States after the release, selling out multiple venues.

The Dunwells completed a successful tour of the UK during February 2015, in which they sold out multiple venues and debuted their new single, 'Lucky Ones'. The band released their second EP of the year, entitled "Lucky Ones'," on 25 May via Concord Music Group.

Light Up The Sky (2016)
On 26 February 2016, the band released their second studio album, Light Up the Sky before embarking on their first European tour.

In the UK, the album was premiered by The Telegraph who said "The album is a blend of electro-infused, indie music" and "their most intimate and epic yet"

Talking about the album, Joe Dunwell said "This is an album full of heart felt lyrics and powerful melodies, it's an album of hope, struggles with everyday life, sadness, happiness, honesty, the desire for more. It's about being a human being with the same emotions as everyone else." David Dunwell said of the album "It's a very honest record. It talks about where we are in life, how frustrated we sometimes are, but also our happiness, some occasional sadness, and the good foundations of our home lives. It's also about how much we want this, the sacrifices we've made, how ready we are".

Musical style
The Dunwells' sound has transformed considerably since their beginning. Their debut album Blind Sighted Faith has been described as a "warm folk-rock record with flavors of Americana and Brit rock" with "carefully picked banjo, hard-strumming guitar," and inward looking lyrics "that make you feel something, without being overly sentimental." As the band has grown and developed over time they have moved away from their folk beginnings. Although the band still emphasizes heartfelt lyrics and big choruses, they have moved towards a fusion of acoustic instrumentation and electronics, drawing influence from their shared love of bands like Bon Iver, Elbow and Damien Rice. Their upcoming EP, 'Lucky Ones', will feature, extensively, this shift in sound, and display the true versatility of The Dunwells.

Band members

 Joseph Dunwell – vocals, acoustic guitar (2009–present)
 David Dunwell – vocals, piano, guitars, banjo (2009–present)
 Rob Clayton – bass, vocals (2011–present)
 Adam Taylor – vocals, drums (2014–present)

Former members
 Lee Dawson – bass, vocals (2009–2011) 
 Dave Hanson – lead guitar, vocals, pedal steel (2009–2013)
 Jonny Lamb – drums, vocals (2009–2014)

Discography

Studio albums
 Blind Sighted Faith (2012) (Playing In Traffic Records/Concord Music Group)
 Light Up the Sky (2016) (Modal Music Limited/Concord Music Group)
Something In the Water (2019) (BrothersArmour)
Live at Aire Street (2020) (BrothersArmour)

Compilation albums
 Follow the Road (2013) (Playing In Traffic Records/Concord Music Group)

EPs
 Leaving the Rose EP (2012) (UK Exclusive)- Playing In Traffic 
 Show Me Emotion EP (September 2014)- Playing In Traffic/Concord
 Lucky Ones EP (May 2015)- Playing In Traffic/Concord

See also
 List of bands originating in Leeds

References

External links
 

Musical groups established in 2009
Alternative rock groups from Leeds
British country rock musical groups
English folk rock groups
Musical quartets
2009 establishments in England